Johann Berger may refer to:
Johann Berger (1845–1933), Austrian chess master, theorist, endgame study composer, author, and editor
Johann Nepomuk Berger (politician) (1816–1870), Austrian lawyer, politician, and writer
Johann Berger (footballer) (born 1999), German footballer

See also
Johannes Berger (died 1481), Roman Catholic prelate